Samuel Taylor Marshall (1812–1895) was one of eight founders of Beta Theta Pi, a college fraternity founded at Miami University in 1839.  It was the first college fraternity founded west of the Allegheny Mountains. Marshall was a lawyer in Lee County, Iowa and served as the sergeant-at-arms of the Iowa legislature (1846–48).  He was the oldest of the eight founders and received his A.B. degree in 1840.

See also
 List of Beta Theta Pi members

Sources
 Brown, James T., ed., Catalogue of Beta Theta Pi, New York: 1917.

External links

Miami University alumni
People from Lee County, Iowa
1812 births
1895 deaths
Beta Theta Pi founders